Parschlug was a municipality in Austria which merged in January 2015 into Kapfenberg in the Bruck-Mürzzuschlag District of Styria, Austria.

Geography
Parschlug lies north of central Kapfenberg at the foot of the Zöbererhöhe.

Its boroughs were Parschlug, Pogier, Pönegg, and Göritz.

History
The earliest surviving record of Parschlug appears in connection with a document gifting lands to Viktring Abbey, dating from 1203.

Around 1800 commercial exploitation of the local brown coal deposits began, and the modern municipality was founded in 1854.

People
Dr. Gerhard Prade KV:8b

References

Cities and towns in Bruck-Mürzzuschlag District